The West Bengal Societies Registration Act, 1961 is an Act of the West Bengal Legislative Assembly, of West Bengal state in India. The Act was passed by the West Bengal Legislature. It was an act to provide for the registration of societies or NGOs whose head office had to be situated in the state of West Bengal. Before this act, the societies in West Bengal were registered under the Societies Registration Act. The act is accompanied by the West Bengal Societies Registration Rules, 1963.

References

A Practical Guide: The West Bengal Societies Registration Act, 1961 by Panchanan Mukhopadyay; first published in 1963 by Mr. Bijan Kumar Som, Salt Lake (Kolkata)

West Bengal state legislation
Organisations based in West Bengal
1961 in law
1961 in India